Nicole Love Hendrickson is an American elected official serving as the chair of the Gwinnett County Board of Commissioners. She is the only full-time and at-large commissioner in the county.  Hendrickson is the first African-American and person of color, and the third woman, to serve as the county's chair.

Early life and education 
Hendrickson was born and raised in Providence, Rhode Island. She graduated from the University of Rhode Island with a bachelor's degree in psychology. She moved to Georgia in the mid-2000's to purse graduate studies.  She earned a Master's of Social Work from the University of Georgia in 2007, specializing in community & non-profit planning.

Career 
Prior to her role with County Government, Hendrickson served as the Associate Director for the Gwinnett Coalition for Health and Human Services for 8 years. During this time, she spearheaded the Gwinnett Neighborhood Leadership Institute, a leadership training program that now has hundreds of alumni. In 2015, the Gwinnett County Board of Commissioners appointed Hendrickson as the county's first Community Outreach Program Director. In this role, Hendrickson founded numerous community engagement and civic education programs including the Gwinnett 101 Citizens Academy and the Gwinnett Youth Commission. In that capacity, Nicole spearheaded the Gwinnett Neighborhood Leadership Institute and led the annual Gwinnett Great Days of Service.

Gwinnett County chairwoman

Campaign and election 
In January 2020, Hendrickson announced her candidacy for the Gwinnett County Board of Commissioners chairmanship saying, "I am uniquely qualified for this position because I have the proven experience in local government and understand the tough decisions that have to be made in order to balance the needs of the community with being a steward of our tax dollars....But most importantly, I have the heart to serve.” Running as a Democrat, Hendrickson competed against four other primary candidates for the party's nomination. After coming in first place in the June primary, Hendrickson won the Democratic nomination in an August primary runoff with nearly 80% of the vote. In the general election, Hendrickson won against the Republican candidate with 58% of the vote.

Tenure 
During her swearing-in ceremony, Hendrickson said, "My promise to you is that we will work to make Gwinnett County a community where economic opportunity is abundant for everyone, a community where affordability isn’t a luxury and a community that leads in regional connectivity. I am grateful to be a partner in addressing the challenges that face us. By working with community, civic and corporate leaders, we will ensure that Gwinnett County is ready and prepared to lead into the future."

In response to the COVID-19 pandemic, Hendrickson oversaw the conversion of a shuttered department store at Gwinnett Place Mall into the county's first mass vaccination site. At the opening of the site, Hendrickson stated, "We saw a need, we had the resources, and we kicked into high gear to make sure we that we could meet a critical need in our community. This site is the product of what it means when we all come together." In April 2021, Hendrickson announced Project Reset 2.0, an expansion of a previously established emergency rental assistance program. The program uses millions of federally funded dollars to help pay rent and utility bills for qualified renters impacted by the pandemic.

"This site is the product of what it means when we all come together. She also helped organize Project RESET 2.0, an expansion of a previously established county emergency rental assistance program. The program uses federal stimulus funds to pay past-due utility payment assistance as well as past-due rent for approved applicants.

Hendrickson helped oversee the development of the Gwinnett Entrepreneur Center, an incubator offering training and office space to local businesses and entrepreneurs. While announcing that the center would begin accepting applications, Hendrickson was quoted saying "Small businesses are essential to a thriving economy — bringing jobs, stimulating economic growth and driving innovation... With more than 26,000 businesses here, the center will help nurture those entrepreneurs by providing guidance that will help their business.”

Hendrickson was the first Gwinnett County chair to establish a transparent application process for county appointments to boards, authorities, and committees. Alongside the other commissioners, Hendrickson established the Gwinnett County Police Citizens Advisory Board and the Gwinnett County Sustainability Commission.

During her keynote speech at the Gwinnett Chamber of Commerce's inaugural Diversity, Equity and Inclusion Summit, Hendrickson announced the Gwinnett Place Mall Redevelopment Equity Plan and the Gwinnett County Equity Action Plan. She also said, "Diversity defines Gwinnett. The County is committed to putting policies and practices in place that not only embrace our diversity, but also harness its energy, creativity and innovative spirit through equity and inclusion,” while encouraging local business leaders "to think about diversity in their own organizations, and... to use an equity lens as they move their businesses forward." She had previously announced that the county would create a chief equity officer position.

Hendrickson has issued proclamations celebrating Juneteenth and, for the first time in Gwinnett's history, acknowledging the 1911 lynching of Charles Hale in Lawrenceville, Georgia. Hendrickson is also the first Gwinnett County Chair to issue a proclamation recognizing LGBTQ+ Pride Month.

Personal life 
Hendrickson is a Native of Providence, Rhode Island where she was born and raised. She moved to Georgia in 2005 to pursue graduate studies at the University of Georgia. She met her husband, Keverne in the early 2000s. They shared a long relationship before getting married in 2012 in Atlanta, Georgia. Nicole and Keverne gave birth to their son, Kaden in 2013. Hendrickson and her family reside in unincorporated Lilburn.

Awards and affiliations 
Hendrickson was named Georgia Trends 2023 100 Most Influential Georgians. Hendrickson was the recipient of the Gwinnett Chamber of Commerce's Public Service Award and the 100 Black Men of Metro Atlanta's Trailblazer Award. Hendrickson eas named one of Engineering Georgia’s 100 Most Influential Women. She is listed as one of Atlanta Business Chronicle’s Power 100: Most Influential Atlantans and had previously been included on Georgia Trend's top 40 under 40.

Hendrickson sits on boards of numerous organizations including the Atlanta Regional Commission, Gwinnett Board of Health, Gwinnett Chamber of Commerce, Georgia Hispanic Chamber of Commerce, and the United Way Gwinnett Community Board. She is a member of the Rotary Club of Gwinnett County.

References 

Year of birth missing (living people)
Living people
County commissioners in Georgia (U.S. state)
University of Rhode Island alumni
Politicians from Providence, Rhode Island
African-American people in Georgia (U.S. state) politics
Women in Georgia (U.S. state) politics
African-American women in politics
21st-century American politicians
21st-century American women politicians
People from Lilburn, Georgia
Georgia (U.S. state) Democrats
21st-century African-American women
21st-century African-American politicians